Xu Lin may refer to:

 Xu Lin (Hanban) (许琳), director of Hanban
 Xu Lin (born 1963) (徐麟), head of the Cyberspace Administration of China

See also
 Lin Xu (林旭), Qing dynasty reformer